Ostrinia palustralis is a species of moth in the family Crambidae described by Jacob Hübner in 1796. It has a trans-Palearctic distribution. In Europe, it is found from Sweden south to Italy and east through eastern Europe to Russia. However, it is absent from the western part of the Balkan Peninsula.

The wingspan is 29–42 mm.

The larvae feed on Rumex species, including Rumex hydrolapathum and Rumex aquaticus.

References

Moths described in 1796
Pyraustinae
Moths of Europe